Cham Rud or Chamrud or Chamerud may refer to:
 Cham Rud, Isfahan
 Cham Rud, Kermanshah
 Cham Rud, Zanjan
 Cham Rud Rural District, in Isfahan Province